The 2001 Grand Prix de Denain was the 43rd edition of the Grand Prix de Denain cycle race and was held on 26 April 2001. The race was won by Jaan Kirsipuu.

General classification

References

2001
2001 in road cycling
2001 in French sport